Furtadoa is a genus of flowering plants in the family Araceae. It consists of only two species: Furtadoa mixta and Furtadoa sumatrensis.

Taxonomic history
The genus was described in 1981 by Mitsuru Hotta, with one species endemic on Sumatra. In 1985, Hotta transferred a preexisting species of Homalomena (the West Malaysian H. mixtum Ridl.) to Furtadoa.

Description
oth described species of Furtadoa have stems that creep, and root along their length (a very rare condition in related Homalomena), and leathery elliptical leaves. The inflorescence is carried on a long peduncle, with the spathes unconstricted, and either green, reddish brown, or purple-grey. The spadix is unique by having the male flowers (except for those at the tip of the spadix) each associated with a sterile female flower (a pistillode) in addition to each fertile female flower being associated with a sterile male flower (staminode).

References

Aroideae
Araceae genera